Lekkersing is a town in Namakwa District Municipality in the Northern Cape province of South Africa.

Lekkersing, located about 50 km from Eksteenfontein and 70 km from Kuboes, lies nestled in the hills of the Richtersveld. Temperatures as high as 53 °C have been recorded in this area.

References

Populated places in the Richtersveld Local Municipality